William B. Roth is an American television and radio sportscaster.  Longtime play-by-play voice of Virginia Tech Hokies football and men's basketball from 1988 to 2015 and again starting in 2022 for Hokies Football, Roth also served as an announcer for the Richmond Braves from 1993–96, and spent 2015-16 with the UCLA Bruins before joining ESPN in 2016.

Education
Roth was born in Pittsburgh and grew up in Mt. Lebanon, Pennsylvania, a suburb of Pittsburgh. While in high school, he interned for radio station KDKA and later at the Duquesne University campus station. Roth graduated from Syracuse University's S. I. Newhouse School of Public Communications in 1987. It was at Syracuse where Roth began his broadcasting career at campus station WAER where he was a radio sportscaster for the Syracuse Orange sports. He won the Bob Costas Scholarship at Syracuse in 1986. After graduating from Syracuse, he began broadcasting various sports for ESPN including field hockey, lacrosse, professional kick boxing, baseball, and other NCAA sports.

Career
Following graduation, Roth began working at Marshall University and was featured on SportsCenter at 21 years old. Seven months into the job, Roth followed his boss David Braine who left Marshall to be the athletic director for the Virginia Tech Hokies.

Virginia Tech
At the age of 22, Roth began working for Virginia Tech as the "Voice of the Hokies" in 1988,
 where he broadcast Hokies football, basketball and baseball games. Roth also served as host of the Hokie Hotline, a weekly radio show featuring Virginia Tech coach Frank Beamer and basketball coaches Frankie Allen, Bill Foster, Bobby Hussey, Ricky Stokes, Seth Greenberg, James Johnson and Buzz Williams. Roth also hosted a weekly television show, Virginia Tech Sports Today, that was shown every Sunday morning on TV stations in Virginia, North Carolina, Tennessee, West Virginia, and Maryland. Roth's tenure is longer than any other sportscaster in Virginia Tech history and he called more games than any other announcer in the school's history. Roth has called several NCAA men's basketball tournaments, and major bowl games: Orange Bowl  (1996, 2008, 2009, 2011), Sugar Bowl (1995, 2000, 2004, 2012), Gator Bowl (1994, 1997, 2000, 2001, 2005.) Roth called games of Virginia Tech great Michael Vick including the school's 1999 undefeated regular season during Vick's time at the school. Roth's signature broadcast opening, marking the transition from pregame to game program, greeted viewers with the phrase "From the Blue Waters of the Chesapeake Bay to the Hills of Tennessee, the Virginia Tech Hokies are on the air."

On April 8, 2022, it was announced Roth would return as the Voice of Hokies Football, following the departure of his successor Jon Laaser.

Richmond Braves
From 1993-1996, Roth served as a play-by-play announcer with the Richmond Braves baseball team, the triple-A affiliate of the Atlanta Braves.

UCLA
In April 2015, Roth was announced as the new play-by-play announcer for the UCLA Bruins, replacing Chris Roberts, who retired after 23 years with the school. After completing the 2015-16 seasons, UCLA announced Roth was being replaced by Josh Lewin
. According to a June 2, 2016 article by David Teel of the Daily Press, Roth will be returning to his East Coast roots, "remain[ing] on the air and with IMG College, developing new, nationally oriented programming from the company's Winston-Salem, N.C., headquarters". Roth also joined the faculty of the Virginia Tech Department of Communications as a professor of practice.

ESPN
Roth joined ESPN’s college football play-by-play team in 2016 as an announcer for ACC, AAC, MAC, and Pac-12 football games. Roth also has called bowl games for ESPN Radio each year since 2016. He has been teamed with a variety of analysts including Mike Golic, Jr., John Congemi, Ray Bentley, Dustin Fox, and Barrett Jones. Roth also called the NCAA Division II National Championship Game for ESPN in 2019. During the 2020 season, he called the epic BYU vs Coastal Carolina game Mormons vs. Mullets game on ESPN.

CBS Sports Network and Westwood One 
Roth basketball play-by-play duties include assignments for CBS Sports Network and Westwood One Radio. Roth calls roughly eight games each season for CBS Sports including the network’s annual coverage of the Jamaica Classic in Montego Bay. Roth joined the Westwood One radio team in 2020 as a play-by-play announcer of NCAA football and basketball.

Honors and awards

Virginia Sports Hall of Fame
In April 2013, Roth was inducted into the Virginia Sports Hall of Fame and Museum in Portsmouth, Virginia.  Roth was inducted into the Commonwealth's Hall of Fame on the same night as Tech all-America defensive end and Baltimore Ravens Super Bowl Champion Cornell Brown. The two joined Bruce Smith, Antonio Freeman, Dell Curry, Allan Bristow, Johnny Oates, Carroll Dale and other Virginia Tech stars in the Virginia Sports Hall of Fame.   , there are 23 Virginia Tech Hokies who have been inducted into the Virginia Sports Hall of Fame.

WAER-Syracuse Hall of Fame
In August 2014, Roth was inducted into the WAER Hall of Fame along with Sean McDonough, Syracuse University's noncommercial radio station, where he began his sports broadcasting career as a student. He was inducted by Mike Tirico who was a classmate at Syracuse with Roth.

Quotes
1995:  "Jim Druckenmiller has pulled off the greatest comeback I've ever seen! TOUCHDOWN TECH! I've never enjoyed saying that more!"   Virginia Tech's come-from behind victory at UVA gives the Hokies a bid to the 1995 Sugar Bowl vs. Texas.

2004:  "Give it to me Roscoe, Give it to me!"  Roth's call of DeAngelo Hall stripping Miami's Roscoe Parrish during Tech's 31-7 win over No.2 Miami at Lane Stadium.

2009:  "And the ACC's Giant Killers have done it again. Tonight, Virginia Tech takes down Number One Wake Forest" at the conclusion of Tech's upset of undefeated No. 1 Wake Forest in men's basketball.

2009:  "It's a miracle in Blacksburg! Tyrod did it Mikey! Tyrod did it!"  Virginia Tech's last-second win over Nebraska in 2009. Roth refers to Virginia Tech quarterback Tyrod Taylor and long-time analyst Mike Burnop.

2013: "That ball was in the air longer than a non-stop flight to Tel Aviv!"  After quarterback Logan Thomas threw a long touchdown pass during Virginia Tech's 2013 season.

2019: "Malcolm Perry is having the greatest homecoming since Beyoncé played Coachella."  During Tennessee-native Malcolm Perry's 213 yard rushing performance in Navy's win over Kansas State in the 2019 Liberty Bowl game in Memphis.

Bill Roth's Bowl Streak 1993-2023

References

External links
 ESPN bio

American radio sports announcers
American television sports announcers
College basketball announcers in the United States
College football announcers
Living people
Lacrosse announcers
Minor League Baseball broadcasters
People from Mt. Lebanon, Pennsylvania
S.I. Newhouse School of Public Communications alumni
UCLA Bruins football announcers
Virginia Tech Hokies baseball announcers
Virginia Tech Hokies men's basketball announcers
Virginia Tech Hokies football announcers
Virginia Tech faculty
Year of birth missing (living people)